The events at the 1992 Winter Olympics were in twelve sports, and a total of 57 Olympic titles: 32 for men, 23 for women, and two mixed in figure skating.

Pairs and ice dance for both men and women